The Firestone Twin 275s were the sixth and seventh races of the 2011 IZOD IndyCar Series season. The races took place on June 11, on the Texas Motor Speedway in Fort Worth, Texas, and was telecasted by Versus in the United States.

The race was unique in its format of two 114-lap races, with each race was for half points.  The second race grid positions were determined by a random draw.

These would ultimately be the last two races of Davey Hamilton's career. Hamilton would be entered into the 2011 IZOD IndyCar World Championship at Las Vegas, however the race would be red flagged due to a huge crash that claimed the life of two time champion Dan Wheldon. The race would not be restarted and as the race had not gone enough distance to be called official, no results were recorded, making these the final two races of Davey Hamilton's career. 

As of the 2022 IndyCar Series, this was the last time that two races took place on the same day, as none have happened since. 

Race two would mark the last time for 66 races that every car finished a race. The next time this would happen would be the 2015 Toyota Grand Prix of Long Beach.

Classification

Qualifying

Race One

Race Two

Championship standings after the race
Drivers' Championship standings

 Note: Only the top five positions are included.

External links 

Firestone Twin 275s
Firestone Twin 275s
Firestone Twin 275s
Firestone 600